The Mughal emperor Bahadur Shah's army moved towards Lohgarh where they engaged with the Sikhs to capture the fort on 16 December 1710.

Battle
Bahadur Shah had planned to advance upon Banda's stronghold at Lohgarh, however reports of Banda's supposed sorcery and supernatural powers had demoralized the imperial soldiers. On 5 December, while a Mughal force under Rustamdil Khan and Firoze Khan Mewati arrived towards Lohgarh to examine the position of Banda's defenses, they were unexpectedly attacked by Banda's forces. The incursion led to heavy imperial losses including Firoz Khan Mewati's nephew killed and son wounded, whereas the Sikhs lost 1,500 men. Unable to stand the surging rush of the Sikh army, Rustamdil Khan's army scattered. Rustamdil subsequently received reinforcements from Prince Rafi-us-Shan and his troops continued to advance to Banda's fort.

Pre-Siege maneuvers 
On 10 December, the imperial army under the command of Rafi-us-Shan, numbering about 60,000, surrounded the fort of Lohgarh on all sides where the left flank was commanded by Rafi-us-Shan of the advance guard of the imperial army and by Raja Udet Singh Bundela of the Bakshi-ul-Mumalik's army, and the right flank commanded by Mumin Khan (Jumat-ul-Mulk Khan-i-Khanan), his sons, Mahabat Khan and Khan Zaman along with Raja Chatarsal Bundela and Islam Khan Mir Atish. The centre was commanded by Rustamdil Khan. Mumin Khan's additional support came from troops of Hamid-ud-din and the cortege of Azim-us-Shan and Jahan Shah. The imperial army also included the reinforcement of large number of Rohilla Afghan, Baloch and other plunderers.

Siege
Near the foot of the hill, heavy fighting took place, resulting in a large number of imperial army casualties and the Sikhs being repulsed and retreating up the hill. Later, the imperial troops attacked the fort in great numbers, there was heavy casualties on both sides where among the dead from imperial side was the son of Sucha Nanda. The Sikhs with the disadvantages of being outnumbered and having no source of food; many dying of starvation, decided to take a chance by cutting through the enemy lines. Gulab Singh, a recent Sikh convert, decided to sacrifice himself by pretending to be Banda Singh Bahadur. The following day, during dawn, in the midst of the confusion resulting from simultaneous firings on both sides, Banda Singh and the surviving Sikhs escaped from the fort.

Following sunrise, the Mughal troops attempted to advance up the hill while the Sikhs were firing at them from their guns within the fort. According to Ganda Singh, Gulab Singh and around 10 or 12 wounded Sikhs were made prisoners. Hari Ram Gupta notes that Gulab Singh and 30 of his men were eventually captured and the civilians from the neighboring village taking refuge in the Sikh fort were taken as prisoners. A large amount of booty in the fort was retrieved by the Mughals. On 12 December, the Mughals discovered that they had captured Banda's duplicate much to their dismay.

References

Lohgarh
Lohgarh
Lohgarh
Lohgarh
1710 in Asia